Konstantinos Papakyritsis (1877 –  ?) was a Greek politician.

Biography 
He was born in Palamas, Karditsa, whose community he became president. He studied in the University of Athens. He was elected MP for Trikala for the first time in the August 1910 Greek legislative election and again in November 1910.

References 

People from Karditsa (regional unit)
Greek MPs 1910 (August–November)
Greek MPs 1910–1912
1877 births
National and Kapodistrian University of Athens alumni
Year of death missing